Calvos de Randín is a municipality in Ourense in the Galicia region of the north-west Spain. It is located to the very south of the province.

It consists of the parishes of Calvos (Santiago); Castelaus (San Martiño), Feás (San Miguel), Golpellás (San Xoán), Lobás (San Vicente), Randín (San Xoán), Rioseco (Santa Mariña) Rubiás de los Mixtos and Vila (Santa María).

References  

Municipalities in the Province of Ourense